6-phosphofructokinase, liver type (PFKL) is an enzyme that in humans is encoded by the PFKL gene on chromosome 21. This gene encodes the liver (L) subunit of an enzyme that catalyzes the conversion of D-fructose 6-phosphate to D-fructose 1,6-bisphosphate, which is a key step in glucose metabolism (glycolysis). This enzyme is a tetramer that may be composed of different subunits encoded by distinct genes in different tissues. Alternative splicing results in multiple transcript variants. [provided by RefSeq, Mar 2014]

Structure

Gene 

The PFKL mRNA sequence includes 55 nucleotides at the 5' and 515 nucleotides at the 3' noncoding regions, as well as 2,337 nucleotides in the coding region, encoding 779 amino acids. This coding region only shares a 68% similarity between PFKL and the muscle-type PFKM.

Protein 
This 80-kDa protein is one of three subunit types that comprise the five tetrameric PFK isozymes. The liver PFK (PFK-5) contains solely PFKL, while the erythrocyte PFK includes five isozymes composed of different combinations of PFKL and the second subunit type, PFKM. The muscle isozyme (PFK-1) is composed solely of PFKM. These subunits evolved from a common prokaryotic ancestor via gene duplication and mutation events. Generally, the N-terminal of the subunits carries out their catalytic activity while the C-terminal contains allosteric ligand binding sites

Function 
This gene encodes one of three protein subunits of PFK, which are expressed and combined to form the tetrameric PFK in a tissue-specific manner. As a PFK subunit, PFKL is  involved in catalyzing the phosphorylation of fructose 6-phosphate to fructose 1,6-bisphosphate. This irreversible reaction serves as the major rate-limiting step of glycolysis. Notably, knockdown of PFKL has been shown to impair glycolysis and promote metabolism via the pentose phosphate pathway. Moreover, PFKL regulates NADPH oxidase activity through the pentose phosphate pathway and according to NADPH levels.

PFKL has also been detected in leukocytes, kidney, and brain.

Clinical significance 
As the erythrocyte PFK is composed of both PFKL and PFKM, this heterogeneic composition is attributed with the differential PFK activity and organ involvement observed in some inherited PFK deficiency states in which myopathy or hemolysis or both can occur, such as glycogenosis type VII (Tarui disease).

Overexpression of PFKL has been associated with Down's syndrome (DS) erythrocytes and fibroblasts and attributed with biochemical changes in PFK that enhance its glycolytic function. Moreover, the PFKL gene maps to the triplicated region of chromosome 21 responsible for DS, indicating that this gene, too, has been triplicated.

Interactive pathway map

Model organisms 

Model organisms have been used in the study of PFKL function. A conditional knockout mouse line, called Pfkltm1a(EUCOMM)Wtsi was generated as part of the International Knockout Mouse Consortium program — a high-throughput mutagenesis project to generate and distribute animal models of disease to interested scientists.

Male and female animals underwent a standardized phenotypic screen to determine the effects of deletion. Twenty six tests were carried out on mutant mice and three significant abnormalities were observed.  Few homozygous mutant embryos were identified during gestation, and none survived until weaning. The remaining tests were carried out on heterozygous mutant adult mice and a hair follicle degeneration phenotype was observed.

See also 
PFK
PFKM
PFKP

References

Further reading 

 
 
 
 
 
 
 
 
 
 
 
 
 
 
 
 

Genes mutated in mice